The Bahr el Ghazal is a region of northwestern South Sudan.  Its name came from the river Bahr el Ghazal. The name translates as "sea of gazelles" from Arabic.

Geography 
Bahr el Ghazal borders the Central African Republic to the west. It is an area of swamps and ironstone plateaus inhabited mainly by the Dinka people, who make their living through subsistence farming and cattle herding plus Luwo and Fartit tribes.

Administrative divisions 
Bahr el Ghazal consists of the following states:
 Lakes
 Northern Bahr el Ghazal
 Warrap
 Western Bahr el Ghazal
 Abyei Area

Between October 2015 and January 2020, the region consisted of the following states:

 Eastern Lakes State
 Gok State
 Western Lakes State
 Aweil East State
 Aweil State
 Tonj State
 Twic State
 Lol State
 Wau State
 Gogrial State
 Abyei Area

History 
It was historically subject to raids by the Fur invaders from the neighboring region of Darfur. The khedive of Egypt made Bahr al Ghazal his province in 1864. Powerful native merchants, who set themselves up as princes complete with armies, emerged in the area. The most powerful of them, al-Zubayr, fought and defeated a joint Turkish/Egyptian force sent to Bahr el Ghazal in 1873. The khedive conceded defeat and made Bahr el Ghazal a nominal province of Egypt, with al-Zubayr as its governor. It came under Mahdist control in 1884, when Karam Allāh Muḥammad Kurkusāwī was appointed governor.

The region was visited by the anthropologist E. E. Evans-Pritchard in 1929. The region was later incorporated into Anglo-Egyptian Sudan and became the ninth province after being split from Equatoria in 1948, and later a province, and then state, under the Republic of Sudan. In 1996, the region was divided into the four current districts as part of an administrative reorganization of the country. During the condominium period of joint British-Egyptian rule, the area was administered by British district officers; because of annual flooding and difficult traveling conditions, the area became part of what was known colloquially in the British Sudan Service as "The Bog", with British District Officers known as "Bog Barons" 

The region has been affected by civil war for many years. It was a scene of fighting in the First Sudanese Civil War.  In 1982, the Sudan People's Liberation Army (SPLA) was formed there by John Garang to fight the Northerners-dominated government in Khartoum. This was the beginning of what quickly became known as the Second Sudanese Civil War.  The subsequent conflict lasted until 2003 and killed more than two million people. A substantial fraction of the population of the region is internally displaced or refugees in neighboring countries.

Under legislation approved by the government of South Sudan in 2011, Bahr el Ghazal could host a planned city at Ramciel intended to serve as the new national capital. If a new capital at Ramciel is built, it would mark a shift away from the power center in Equatoria, though Ramciel is located very close to the border between Lakes state and Central Equatoria.

See also
1998 Sudan famine

References

Wyndham, R, 1936, The Gentle Savage, A Journey in the Province of Bahr El Ghazal, commonly known as 'The Bog', (New York: William Morrow and Company).

External links

 Bahr-el-Ghazal, The Columbia Encyclopedia, Sixth Edition

 
Regions of South Sudan
Historical regions